40th Anniversary of the Rocket Man was a concert tour by Elton John taking place in Oceania, Asia, North America, South America, and Europe celebrating the 40th anniversary of his top 20 hit single "Rocket Man".

Background
40 years ago, during April 1972, "Rocket Man" was released around the world. To celebrate the landmark anniversary of its release, Elton John has been taking the celebrations globally for a world tour and will be returning to Australia for his record 42nd Sydney Entertainment Centre show plus a very special run of shows, some in parts of Australia he has never been in.

John added a second concert at the newly constructed Perth Arena on 10 November, opening the arena. Originally George Michael had been scheduled to open the arena, but pulled out and John took his place.

Both the 2012 Greatest Hits Live tour and the 2012 legs of the 40th Anniversary of the Rocket Man tour made it onto Billboards "Top 25 Tours of 2012" at #19 with 36 shows, 28 of which were sell-outs. John performed to 240,381 people, making $32,920,986 (£20,946,700). On 22 March 2013 John's South American tour topped that week's Billboard Hot Tours. While in Brazil, he had played to 52,492 people and made $6,332,640. One of the Brazilian concerts, in Belo Horizonte, was sold out, the only sold out date of the tour.

Opening acts
2Cellos (12 November – 4 December 2012)
Schmidt (14-18 November 2012, Melbourne)
Pnau (16 November 2012, Sydney)

Set list
This set list is representative of the first show in Perth. It does not represent all dates throughout the tour.
"The Bitch Is Back"
"Bennie and the Jets"
"Grey Seal"
"Levon"
"Tiny Dancer"
"Believe"
"Mona Lisas and Mad Hatters"
"Philadelphia Freedom"
"Candle in the Wind"
"Goodbye Yellow Brick Road"
"Rocket Man"
"Hey Ahab"
"I Guess That's Why They Call It the Blues"
"Funeral for a Friend/Love Lies Bleeding"
"Honky Cat"
"Sad Songs"
"Sacrifice"
"Daniel"
"Don't Let the Sun Go Down on Me"
"Are You Ready for Love"
"I'm Still Standing" 
"Crocodile Rock"
"Saturday Night's Alright for Fighting"
"Your Song"
"Circle of Life"

Tour dates

Festivals and other miscellaneous performances
This concert was part of "Festival de Viña del Mar 2013"
This concert was part of "Stars of Sounds Open Air Murten 2013"
This concert was part of "Live at the Marquee"
This concert was part of "Festival de Poupet"
This concert was part of "Bestival"
This concert was part of "iTunes Festival"
This concert was solo concert.

Cancellations and rescheduled shows

Box office score data

Tour band
Elton John – piano, vocals
Davey Johnstone – guitar, banjo, backing vocals
Matt Bissonette – bass guitar, backing vocals
Kim Bullard – keyboards
John Mahon – percussion, backing vocals
Nigel Olsson – drums, backing vocals
Lisa Stone – backing vocals
Rose Stone – backing vocals
Tata Vega – backing vocals
Jean Witherspoon – backing vocals
Sources:

During the 2012 Asian tour the 2Cellos left the Elton John Band to pursue other projects following the release of their album In2ition.

Controversies
John drew incredibly harsh criticism during his concert in Beijing when he dedicated the show to dissident artist Ai Weiwei. A state-owned newspaper accused the veteran British singer of being 'disrespectful' and said his actions could lead to a ban on other Western performers putting on shows in China. At the end of the show, John stunned his audience when he said he was dedicating the show to Weiwei. He said he was there to give tribute to Weiwei's 'honour and talent'. The Global Times, a paper run by the ruling Communist Parties, The People's Daily, said in an editorial: "John's unexpected action was disrespectful to the audience and the contract that he signed with the Chinese side, he forcibly added political content to the concert, which should have been nothing more than an entertaining performance. John's action will also make the relevant agencies further hesitate in the future when they invite foreign artists. John himself is a senior entertainment figure, but has raised difficulties for future arts exchanges between China and other countries."

It was later revealed that as a result of John's comments at his concert in Beijing that Chinese authorities were considering tightening concert rules so that only artists with University degrees could perform in the country. This would rule out any return to China for John. He was also questioned by Chinese authorities after the concert regarding his remarks.

Conservative campaigners demanded that John should cancel his concert in Kuala Lumpur, Malaysia. Although John's scheduled performance went ahead at the Genting Arena of Stars, he faced fierce opposition from Muslim activists who object to openly gay performers performing in Malaysia as homosexual activities are illegal in the country. John faced down similar protests when he  performed his first ever concert in Malaysia at the same venue just a year before.

External links
Elton John's official website

References

Elton John concert tours
2012 concert tours
2013 concert tours